Idenburg is a surname. Notable people with the surname include:

Alexander Willem Frederik Idenburg (1861–1935), Dutch politician
Florian Idenburg (born 1975), Dutch architect
Petrus Johannes Idenburg (1898–1989), Dutch jurist
Philip Idenburg (1901–1995), Dutch educationalist and statistician